Peter Jørgen Frydendahl (1766-1830), was a Danish stage actor.  He belonged to the elite actors of the Royal Danish Theatre from 1786. He was described as a versatile actor, was active also as a singer, and particularly noted for his comic roles, for which he was called the most noted of his time. He was also principal of the acting school from 1816.

Early life and education
Frydendahl grew up as the son of textile merchant Hans Peter Frydendahl (c. 1705-91) and Kirstine Mortensdatter (c. 1745-94) but his real father was Hans Wilhelm von Warnstedt who had served as managing director of the Royal Danish Theatre since 1876. He apprenticed as an office clerk before his father got him into the Royal Theatre's singing school where he studied under Michel Angelo Potenza.

Career
He had his debut on 7 December 1786 as Belcour in The West Indian followed by a role as Charles in The School for Scandal. Both performances were poorly received.

Personal life
Frydendahl was the spouse of Catharine Frydendahl.

List of roles

1780s
 1780	Den vægelsindede as Musikant
 1785	Den døve elsker as Den fremmede
 1786	Den stundesløse as Lars Dintfas, skriverkarl
 1786	Figaros giftermaal as Tjener
 1786	Vestindianeren as Belcour, ung vestindianer
 1787	Bagtalelsens skole as Charles
 1787	Barselstuen as Godthard, kantor
 1787	Claudina af Villa Bella as Vagt
 1787	Crispin lakaj og doktor as Leander, Alcines elsker
 1787	Crispin sin herres rival as Valerius
 1787	De nysgerrige mandfolk as Eraste, Julies elsker
 1787	Den ellevte Juni as Proprietær / Vægter
 1787	Den gerrige as Graaben
 1787	Den nysgerrige as Grev Donner
 1787	Den stolte as Philinte, Isabellas frier
 1787	Den stundesløse as Barber
 1787	Det uventede møde as Banu, slave
 1787	Don Juan as Ragotin
 1787	Emilie Galotti as Conti, maler
 1787	Enke- og ligkassen as Bud
 1787	Eugenie as Sir Carl, Eugenies broder
 1787	Gert Westphaler as Apotekerdreng
 1787	Greven af Walltron as Von Lictenau, adjudant
 1787	Henrik den fjerdes jagt as Jean, jæger
 1787	Hververne as Baron Wengfort
 1787	Jeppe paa Bjerget as Baronens sekretær
 1787	Kilderejsen as Leander
 1787	Købmanden i Smyrna as Spanier
 1787	Mediceerne as Montsec
 1787	Melampe as Gamle Pandolfus
 1787	Plutus as Moralist / Raadsherre
 1787	Søofficererne as Smirk, gadejunker
 1787	Ulysses von Ithacia as Kejser Asverus
 1788	Aglae as Erastenes
 1788	Aktierne as Frands Kronskjold
 1788	Bagtalelsens skole as Charles
 1788	Barberen i Sevilla as Alkade
 1788	Datum in Blanco as Barthold, officer
 1788	Den bedragne formynder as Fuldmægtig
 1788	Den ellevte Juni as Proprietær / Vægter
 1788	Den forlegne forfatter as Pladder
 1788	Den gerrige as Valerius
 1788	Den politiske as kandestøber	Sanderus
 1788	Den stundesløse as Lars Dintfas
 1788	Den sværmende filosof as Turburgio
 1788	Den taknemlige as søn	Mikkel, bondekarl
 1788	Den uheldige lighed as Denbigh
 1788	Desertøren af sønlig kærlighed as Stich, korporal
 1788	Det lykkelige skibbrud as Leander
 1788	Florentineren as Leander
 1788	General Schlenzheim og hans familie as Vagtmester Zelle
 1788	Hekseri as Byvagt
 1788	Henrik og Pernille as Leander
 1788	Jeppe paa Bjerget as Baronens sekretær
 1788	Jægerne as Rudolph
 1788	Markeder as Løjtnant
 1788	Pernilles korte frøkenstand as Leander
 1788	Skotlænderinden as Kafégæst
 1788	Skovbyggeren as Dolmon
 1789	Aglae as Erastenes
 1789	Apothekeren og doctoren as Politikommisær
 1789	Bagtalelsens skole as Henry Bumper
 1789	Barselstuen as Officer
 1789	De to gerrige as Mustafa / Ali
 1789	Den pantsatte bondedreng as Postkarl
 1789	Den stundesløse as Barber / Lars Dintfas
 1789	Den sværmende filosof as Florian, Clarices elsker
 1789	Den uformodentlige forhindring as Valerius, spradebasse
 1789	Desertøren as Eisenfelt, vagtmester
 1789	Det unge menneske efter moden as Strax
 1789	Det uventede møde as Kalender
 1789	Don Juan as Don Alfonse
 1789	Fejltagelserne as Krogæst
 1789	Forbryderen af ærgerrig as Baron von Ritau
 1789	Greven af Olsbach as von Wernin
 1789	Henrik den Fjerdes jagt as Marki Conchiny
 1789	Henrik og Pernille as Leander
 1789	Hververne as Kittmann, vagtmester
 1789	Julestuen as Leander
 1789	Myndlingen as Valerius
 1789	Ringen as Opvarter
 1789	Tartuffe as Damon
 1790	Damon og Phytias as Leptimus
 1790	De aftakkede officerer as von Fannenberg
 1790	De nysgerrige fruentimmere as Valerius

1879s
 1790	De to gerrige as Ali
 1790	De tre forpagtere as Jacob, Sørens søn
 1790	Den stundesløse as Leander, Leonoras elsker
 1790	Desertøren af sønlig kærlighed as Stich, korporal
 1790	Det gavmilde testamente as Eraste, Isabelles kæreste
 1790	Dobleren as Valerius, dobleren
 1790	Frode og Fingal as Alf
 1790	Grovsmeden as Bastian
 1790	Italienerinden i London as Lord Arespingh
 1790	Jacob von Tyboe as Officer
 1790	Julie as Præsident
 1790	Kun seks retter as Fritz
 1790	Selim og Mirza as Orcan, sømand
 1790	Skovbyggeren as Jæger
 1790	Steffen og Lise as Jacob
1790	Søofficererne as Simmons 
 1790	Zemire og Azor as Sander, persisk købmand
 1791	Aglae as Erastenes
 1791	Bagtalelsens skole as Henry Bumber
 1791	Balders Død as Thor
 1791	Barselstuen as Officer
 1791	Den honette ambition as Leander, Leonoras forlovede
 1791	Den naturlige søn as Hr. Blushenley
 1791	Den værdige fader as Grev Monheim
 1791	Høstgildet as Thord Halvorson
 1791	Lilla as Lubin, hyrde
 1791	Richard Løvehjerte as Florestan
 1791	Strelitzerne as Officer
 1791	Syngesygen as Chrysante
 1791	Taknemlighed og utaknemlighed as Løjtnant Berlau
 1791	Zarine as Fire Sacer
 1792	Aglae as Erastenes
 1792	Bagtalelsens skole as Henry Bumber
 1792	Balders Død as Thor
 1792	Barselstuen as Gothard, kantor
 1792	De forstilte utroskaber as Mondor
 1792	Den bogstavelige udtydning as William
 1792	Den døve elsker as Georg
 1792	Den nysgerrige as Prins Kasimir
 1792	Den skinsyge kone as Lord Trinket
 1792	Feen Ursel as Oberjægermester
 1792	Indianerne i England as Samuel, toldinspektør
 1792	Jeppe paa Bjerget as Baronens sekretær / Doktor
 1792	Maskeraden as Leander
 1792	Myndlingerne as Hofraad Fressel
 1792	Papegøjen as Ludvig
 1792	Skotlænderinden as Kafégæst
 1793	Apothekeren og doctoren as Politikommisær
 1793	De to hatte as Hr. von Mørbak
 1793	Indtoget as Bræger, degn
 1793	Lise og Peter as Jespersen, købmand
 1794	Apothekeren og doctoren as Politikommisær
 1795	Aftenen as Vilhelm Steenberg
 1795	Apothekeren og doctoren as Stødvel, apoteker
 1795	Bagtalelsens skole as Gæst
 1795	Barselstuen as Offic
 1795	De to søskende as Dorval
 1795	De to venner as Saint Albin, general told-forpagter
 1795	Den stundesløse as Christoffer Federmesser
 1795	Den værdige kone as Hr. Berg
 1795	Det unge menneske efter moden as Strax
 1795	Fejltagelserne as Marlow
 1795	Gamle og nye sæder as Grøndal den yngre
 1795	Gulddaasen as Visberg, proprietær
 1795	Hekseri as Dommer
 1795	Høstgildet as Hans Jensen
 1795	I oprørt vand er godt at fiske as Baron
 1795	Kinafarerne as Merian
 1795	Kjolen fra Lyon as Hr. von Hornau
 1795	Kong Theodorus i Venedig as Theodorus, konge af Korsika
 1795	Minna af Barnheim as Ricaut de la Marliniere
 1795	Moderen as Hr. von Horst
 1795	Peter bryllup as Hans Smed
 1795	Renaud d'Ast as Hr. Lisimon, guvernør
 1795	Rosenbruden i Salency as Herremand
 1795	Serenaden as Degnen
 1795	Steffen og Lise as Jacob
 1795	Strelitzerne as Soukaninn
 1795	Zemire og Azor as Zander, persisk købmand
 1796	Advokaterne as Justitsråd Gleiser
 1796	Barberen i Sevilla as Grev Almaviva
 1796	Barselstuen as Officer
 1796	Den overtroiske as Hans Snak, urtegaardsmand
 1796	Den politiske kandestøber	Sanderus
 1796	Den skarpe kniv kan let faa skaar	Hofraad Reichenstein
 1796	Den værdige fader	Grev Monheim
 1796	Dyveke	Kong Christiern den anden
 1796	Festen i Valhal	Thor
 1796	Gulddaasen	Visberg, proprietær
 1796	Indtoget	Bræger, degn
 1796	Kuren	Schrep
 1796	Landsbypigen	Orgon, Sophies formynder
 1796	Peters bryllup	Hans Smed
 1796	Ringen	Grev Klingsberg
 1796	Skotlænderinden	Kafégæst
 1796	Søofficererne	Grev Worthinton
 1796	Vinhøsten	Oberst Tosberg
 1796	Væddemaalet	Marki af Blainville
 1797	Bagtalelsens skole	Gæst
 1797	Barnlig kærlighed	Armand
 1797	Coquetten og den forstilte kyskhed	Damis, Cephises mand
 1797	De fire formyndere	Sir Phillip Modelove
 1797	De noble passioner	Grev Blomsterkrantz
 1797	De snorrige fættere	Hr. Orgon
 1797	Den stundesløse	Leander / Erik Madsen, bogholder
 1797	Dragedukken	Gæst
 1797	Embedsiver	Justitsraad Listar
 1797	Galejslaven	Greven af Anplace
 1797	Hververne	Kittmann, Vagtmester
 1797	Jaordet	Ville, købmand
 1797	Jockeyen	Damon
 1797	Jøden	Charles Ratchliffe
 1797	Lykkens hjul	Woodville
 1797	Menneskehad og anger	Major von der Horst
 1797	Niels Ebbesen af Nørreris	Stig Andersen
 1797	Nonnerne	Postkarl
 1797	Sammensværgelsen mod Peter d. Store	En fransk officer
 1797	Strelitzerne	Soukaninn
 1797	Venskab paa prøve	Blandford, skibskaptajn
 1798	Bagtalelsens skole	Gæst
 1798	Barselstuen	Officer
 1798	Den ellevte Juni	Proprietær
 1798	Den skinsyge kone	Major Oakly
 1798	Det unge menneske efter moden	Lisimon
 1798	Elskernes skole	Astolfo
 1798	Entreprenøren i knibe	Polifem, entreprenør
 1798	Falsk undseelse	Justitsraad Heldmand
 1798	Fejltagelserne	Roller, en ung julinsk helt
 1798	Pebersvendene	Poul Jensen
 1798	Peters bryllup	Hans Jensen
 1798	Rejsen til Byen	Hofraad Reising
 1798	Ringen	Grev Klingsberg
 1798	Skumlerne	Edward smith
 1799	Bortførelsen	Arvire, en britannisk Fyrste
 1799	Desertøren	Eisenfelts, vagtmester
 1799	Emigranterne	Aldrende emigrant
 1799	Hekseri	Dommer
 1799	Hververne	Baron Plume
 1799	Medbejlerne	Major Schreckenfeldt
 1799	Naturens Røst	Belcour, Claires Fader
 1799	Philip og Annette	Martin, kræmmer
 1799	Udstyret	Kammerraad Wallmann
 1800	De pudserlige arvinger	Baron von Falkenburg
 1800	Den stundesløse	Erik Madsen, Bogholder

1800s
' 1800	Det lykkelige skibbrud as Officer
 1800	Fredsmægleren as Dorval
 1800	Herman von Unna as Greven af Unna
 1800	Landsbyteatret as Kaptajn Lavish
 1800	Min bedstemoder as Lafleur
 1800	Nonnerne as Frontin
 1800	Optimisten as Oberst Dalberg
 1800	Ægteskabsforslaget as Cazini, Rosalines onkel
 1801	Advokaterne as Justitsraad Gleiser
 1801	Armod og høimodighed as Peter Plum
 1801	Barberen i Sevilla as Grev Almaviva
 1801	De forliebte haandværksfolk as Partout
 1801	De to grenaderer as Sans-Regret, Dragon
 1801	Herman von Unna as Greven af Unna
 1801	Hvad vil folk sige? as Officer
 1801	Høstgildet as Thord Halvorsen
 1801	Indtoget as Bræger, degn i en Landsby
 1801	Myndlingerne as Kansler Flessel
 1801	Pebersvendene as Poul Jensen
 1801	Sølvbrylluppet as Grev Skjoldholm
 1801	Udstyret as Kammerraad Wallmann
 1802	Armod og høimodighed as Claus
 1802	Barberen i Sevilla as Grev Almaviva
 1802	Den fattige familie as Grandin
 1802	Den politiske kandestøber as Sanderus
 1802	Den snedige brevvexling as Fougère, historie-Maler
 1802	Hjemkomsten as Poul Hansen
 1802	Octavia as Ventidius, romersk general
 1802	Onkelrollen as Dorval, handelsmand
 1802	Operetten as Florimon
 1802	Syv tusinde Rigsdaler as Kaptajn Hennings
 1803	Barberen i Sevilla as Grev Almaviva
 1803	Barselstuen as Officer
 1803	Coquetten og den forstilte kyskhed as Damis, Cephises mand
 1803	De fire formyndere as Sir Phillip Modelove
 1803	De lystige passagerer as Saint-Hilaire, skuespiller
 1803	De to dage as Guiscardo
 1803	Den stundesløse as Erik Madsen, Bogholder
 1803	Den værdige fader as Grev Wodmar
 1803	En time borte as Merinval
 1803	Lønkammeret as Dupont
 1803	Pebersvendene as Poul Jensen
 1803	Pigen fra Marienborg as Alexander Menzikoff, fyrste
 1803	Ponce de Léon as	Caffardo
 1803	Rivalerne as Hr. Orgon
 1803	Rosenkæderne as Thøger, broder til Norbeks første kone
 1803	Skumlerne as Grev von scharfeneck, premierminister
 1804	Advokaterne as Justitsraad Geisler
 1804	Balders død as Thor
 1804	Barnlig kærlighed as Armand
 1804	Barselstuen as Officer
 1804	Den logerende as Sommer, godsejer
 1804	Kun seks retter as Major von Wurmb
 1804	Kvaksalverne as Robert
 1804	Nytaarsgaven as Meerval, en rig mand
 1804	Rejsen til Ostindien as Courville, rig købmand
 1804	Skatten as Geronte, en gammel mand
 1804	Skælmen i sin egen snare as Beaupré, skibsbygmester
 1805	Barselstuen as Officer
 1805	De to Figaroer as Grev Almaviva
 1805	Den stundesløse as Erik Madsen, Bogholder
 1805	Fusentasterne as Hr. Klingstrup, herremand fra Jylland
 1805	Selim Prins af Algier as Barbarossa
 1805	Utidig fortrolighed as Dorimond, gammel herremand
 1806	Armod og høimodighed as Peter Plum
 1806	En times ægteskab as Hr. de Marce, gammel herremand
 1806	Eugenie as Mylord Greve af Clarendon
 1806	Menneskehad og anger as Grev Wintersee
 1806	Romeo og Juliette as Capulet, adelsmand
 1806	Skillerummet as Durivage
 1806	Ungdom og galskab as Grøndal, en gammel maler
 1807	Barselstuen as Officer
 1807	Maleren af kærlighed as Merfort
 1807	Tvekampen as Don simon, alkade i Segovia
 1808	Armod og høimodighed as Peter Plum
 1808	Barberen i Sevilla as Grev Almaviva
 1808	Den forladte datter as Baron Skumring
 1808	Henrik den femtes ungdom as Rochester, hans yndling
 1808	Kærlighed under maske as Belcour, gammel herremand
 1809	Advokaterne as Justitsraad Geisler
 1809	De forliebte haandværksfolk as Partout
 1809	Emilie Galotti as Odoardo Galotti
 1809	Marionetterne as Dorvilé
 1809	Sovedrikken as Brause, kirurg

1810s
 
 1810	Bagtalelsens skole as Sir Peter Teazle
 1810	De fire formyndere as Kaptajn Harcourt
 1810	De Sansesløse	Major Staubwirbel as * 1810	Den forladte datter	Baron Skumring
 1810	Den unge moder as Dorimont, købmand
 1810	Hververne as Hr. von Rosenau, præsident
 1810	Juliane von Lindorak as Feltmarskal Dombraun
 1810	Snedkeren i Lifland as Peter den store, russisk kejser
 1811	De to dage as Armand, første parlaments-præsident i Paris
 1811	Figaros giftermaal as Grev Almaviva
 1811	Jacob von Tyboe as Jacob von Tyboe
 1811	Lommeprokuratoren as Guillaume, klædekræmmer
 1811	Octavia as Cæsar Octavianus
 1811	Tyve-Aars-Festen as Major Broderkjær, vestindisk * regeringsraad
 1812	Advokaterne as Justitsraad Gleiser
 1812	Bagtalelsens skole as Sir Peter Teazle
 1812	Den forladte datter as Baron Skumring
 1812	Henrik den fjerdes jagt as Hertugen af sully, * premierminister
 1812	Herman von Unna as Wenceslaus, romersk kejser
 1813	Advokaterne as 	Justitsraad Gleiser
 1813	Bagtalelsens skole as Sir Peter Teazle
 1814	Dyveke as Kong Christiern den anden
 1815	Landsbyteatret as Mr. Mist
 1815	Aabenbar krig as Baron Frydenhjelm
 1816	Balders død as Thor
 1816	Beverley as Stukeli
 1816	Bortførelsen as Baron Rosendahl
 1816	Crispin som fader as Orgon
 1816	Den butte velgører as Dorval
 1816	Diderich Menschenskræk as Diderich Menschenskræk
 1816	Galejslaven as Greven af Anplace
 1816	Jægerne as v. Zeck, amtmand i Weissenberg
 1816	Pebersvendene as Advokat Rosendal
 1816	Selim Prins af Algier as Barbarossa
 1816	Sovedrikken as Brause, kirurg
 1817	Abracadabra as Arv, gaardskarl
 1817	Beverley as Stukeli, Beverleys falske ven
 1817	Den forladte datter as Halvor Jerken, gammel betjent
 1817	Den gerrige as Valerius
 1817	Hververne as Hr. von Rosenau, præsident
 1817	Sølvbrylluppet as Grev Skjoldholm
 1818	 Apothekeren og doctoren as Stødvel, apoteker
 1818	Dragedukken as Jacob Olsen, skomager
 1818	Dyveke as Kong Christian II
 1818	Niels Ebbesen af Nørreris as Gert den store
 1819	Dyveke as Kong Christian II
 1819	Figaros giftermaal as Figaro, grevens kammertjener og * slotsforvalter
 1819	Romeo og Juliette as Capulet, adelsmand
 1819	Vinhøsten as Oberst v. Tosberg, godsejer
 1820	Herman von Unna as Greven af Unna

1820s
 1820	Zemire og Azor as Sander, en persisk købmand
 1821	Diderich Menschenskræk as Diderich Menschenskræk
 1821	Dyveke as Kong Christiern den anden
 1821	Falsk undseelse as Justitsraad Heldmand
 1821	Figaros giftermaal as Don Gusman Bridoison
 1821	Kun seks retter as Major von Wurmb
 1821	Vinhøsten as Oberst v. Tosberg, godsejer
 1822	Apothekeren og doctoren as Stødvel, apoteker
 1822	Barselstuen as Officer
 1822	De to dage as Guiscardo
 1822	Ægteskabsskolen as Wilhelm Stjernholm, Alberts broder
 1823	Apothekeren og doctoren as Stødvel, apoteker
 1823	Det stille vand har den dybe grund as Baron Friedheim
 1823	Hekseri as Dommer
 1824	Apothekeren og doctoren as Stødvel, apoteker
 1824	De to poststationer as Duflos
 1824	Fejltagelserne as Heardcastle
 1824	Landsbypoeten as Baron Vieux-Bois
 1825	Barberen i Sevilla as Bartholo, doktor
 1825	Barselstuen as Officer
 1825	Det stille vand har den dybe grund as Baron Friedheim
 1825	Vestindianeren as Major O'Flaherty, gammel officer
 1826	Apothekeren og doctoren as Stødvel, apoteker
 1826	Entreprenøren i knibe as Polifem, entreprenør
 1826	Hamlet as Polonius (Dub.)
 1827	Barselstuen as Officer
 1827	Bortførelsen as Hr. v. Sachau
 1827	Den aabne brevveksling as Goldbach, en Aagerkarl
 1827	Det tvungne giftermaal as Marphurius
 1827	Diderich Menschenskræk as Diderich Menschenskræk
 1827	Dyveke as Kong Christian II
 1827	Emilie Galotti as Marinelli, Prinsens Kammerherre
 1827	Enken og ridehesten as Warbifax, advokat
 1827	Tartuffe as Orgon, Elmires mand
 1828	Apothekeren og doctoren as Stødvel, apoteker
 1828	Købmanden i Venedig as Hertugen af Venedig
 1829	Barselstuen as Officer
 1829	Jægerne as v. Zeck, amtmand i Weissenberg
 1829	Ringen as Hr. von Holm, en rig bankier

1830s
 1830	Aabenbar krig as Baron Frydenhjelm
 1831	Barselstuen as Officer
 1831	Jacob von Tyboe as Jacob von Tyboe
 1831	Kvaksalverne as Don sebastian
 1832	Armod  og højmodighed as Peter Plum
 1832	Jacob von Tyboe as Jacob von Tyboe
 1833	Apothekeren og doctoren as Stødvel, apotekere
 1835	Barselstuen as Officer

References

External links

1766 births
1830 deaths
18th-century Danish male actors
19th-century Danish male actors